Valmont is a commune in the Seine-Maritime department in the Normandy region in northern France.

Geography
The village is surrounded by woodland. Just outside the village, at Le Vivier, is the source of the river Valmont.

History
The commune was created in 1822 and 1825 by the merger of four former parishes of Valmont, Saint-Ouen-au-Bosc, Rouxmesnil and Le Bec-au-Cauchois.  
In 1169, the abbey of Notre-Dame-du-Pre was founded here by Nicolas of Estouteville. It was devastated during the Hundred Years' War but was repaired and became a nunnery. In 1416 the Battle of Valmont took place near the town, as part of the Hundred Years' War.

Population

Places of interest
 The ruins of Notre-Dame abbey, dating from the twelfth century.
 The church of St. Nicolas.
 The chateau of Estouteville, dating from the eleventh century with a donjon and a large public park.
Les Petites Dalles, a seaside resort

People
 The naturalist Georges Cuvier was a tutor and secretary from 1791 to 1794 at Fiquainville chateau.
 Eugène Delacroix, artist, spent some time at Valmont. Here he painted the Ruines de l'abbaye de Valmont, which nowadays hangs in the Louvre.

See also
Communes of the Seine-Maritime department

References

External links

 Video website of Valmont 

Communes of Seine-Maritime